Braconini is a tribe of wasps in the subfamily Braconinae.

References

External links 
 
 
 
 Braconnini at insectoid.info

Parasitica tribes
Braconinae
Taxa named by Christian Gottfried Daniel Nees von Esenbeck